Ugo Carrega (17 August 1935 – 7 October 2014) was an Italian artist and poet. Carrega was one of the main exponents of visual poetry, although he preferred the term "New Writing", an experimental form of writing that combines signs of different extraction. Carrega was active mainly in Milan, where he founded the cultural centers Centro Suolo (1969), Centro Tool (1971), Mercato del Sale (1974) and Euforia Costante (1993). He also founded and directed the art magazines Tool (1965), Bollettino Tool (1968), aaa (1969) and Bollettino da dentro (1972).

Life

Youth and studies
Ugo Carrega was born in Genoa, in the Pegli neighborhood, on 17 August 1935. His father was Lelio Carrega, naval officer, and his mother was Maria Teresa Repetti, housewife. Carrega studied at the religious high school managed by the Piarists in Cornigliano, and then in a few private schools, without achieving a diploma. In 1955, he was pushed by his parents to travel to London to learn the profession of shipping agent, and there he became proficient in the English language. The following year he returned to Italy and worked as a shipping agent, then since 1963 as a translator for various publishers. Since he was a child he wrote poems, and in 1952 he collected them under the title Verde la casa (Green the House). The second collection, from 1955, is titled Per il cielo di Fiandra (For the Sky of Flander). Initially Carrega's poetry was inspired by Gabriele D'Annunzio, Dino Campana, Ceccardo Roccatagliata Ceccardi and Camillo Sbarbaro, but after discovering James Joyce, Ezra Pound, and E. E. Cummings he started experimenting with new linguistic forms based on the broadening of the semantic extension of the word.

In 1958, Carrega started working with Martino Oberto, and it was through this collaboration that he began his activity as a verbo-visual artist. In 1963, he became editor of the magazine Ana eccetera, directed by Martino Oberto and his wife Anna Bontempi. In 1965, he published in the magazine the article Analisi grafica del linguaggio. Rapporto tra il poeta e il suo lavoro, a true theoretical program where he presented his ideas about art and poetry. From literary positions, Carrega proposed the foundation of a new language integrating the alphabetic script with graphical elements of a different nature. The cornerstone of the work of the verbo-visual artist is the written page intended as an "instrument-in-itself-of expression". The elements that form the page are the verbal element and the graphical one, which constitute respectively the "technical relationship" and the "essential relationship" that is tied to the energy of the organization of the written page.

Tool
On the basis of the experience of Ana eccetera, in 1965 Carrega founded the magazine Tool with Rodolfo Vitone, Lino Matti, Vincenzo Accame, Rolando Mignani, and Liliana Landi. Like Ana eccetera, Tool aims to extend the area of writing through an analysis and restructuring of languages, but in a more practical way. The magazine, whose name refers to the tool of the poet, is published in six mimeographed notebooks in which the use of the mimeograph is chosen to give immediate emphasis to the graphical signs. In Tool there will be a concrete elaboration of "symbiotic writing", a form of experimental poetry in which signs of different nature act in a harmonious way. Starting from the idea of the "Global Page", an ideal place where writing is enriched by expressions and graphical signs, Carrega defines "symbiotic writing" as a form of writing that visualizes not only an interaction, but a symbiosis between verbal and graphical signs.

In Tool, Carrega lists the six conceptual categories of graphical and verbal expression that freely combine in the space of the white page: phonetic element, prepositional element, lettering, graphics, shape, color. Carrega's work finds original combinations between words, the writing medium and the contamination with other con altri materials from which emerge innovative experiments such as: transparent papers, poemobiles, arronsignite papers, stone-cakes, sbrinciate, verbal permutators, etc. Since 1967 symbiotic writing is called “New Writing”, necessary "to extend the field of action to research spaces that have become more and more vast", but this new definition will become active only in 1974. The following year Carrega signed the manifesto of New Writing with Vincenzo Accame, Martino and Anna Oberto, Corrado D'Ottavi, Rolando Mignani, Liliana Landi, and Vincenzo Ferrari.

Cultural centers and other magazines
In 1966, Carrega moved to Milan, artistic junction of verbo-visual research. In 1969, he founded and directed the Centro Suolo (Soil Center), a center for research and sharing of advanced poetry, with Antonio Agriesti, Alfonso Galasso, Giustino Gasbarri, Tomaso Kemeny, and Raffaele Perrotta. The center, located in via Morgagni 35 in Milan, aimed to stimulate and promote poetic research through frequent exhibitions. At the Centro Suolo, Carrega organized the first international exhibition of "advanced poetry". The center closed down a few months later. In May 1970, Carrega's works were exhibited for the first time in the Arturo Schwarz gallery in Milan. Since that moment he abandoned his job of translator to work full-time on his art and the promotion of that of fellow visual artists. Since the end of the 1960s, he increased his activity of cultural promoter and exhibition organizer with the foundation of other cultural centers dedicated to verbo-visual research.

In April 1968, Carrega began publishing Bollettino Tool (Tool Bulletin), a new aperiodical magazine collecting news and examples of advanced poetry including works by Vincenzo Accame, Mirella Bentivoglio, Gianni Bertini, Henri Chopin, Ian Hamilton Finlay, Eugen Gomringer, Anselm Hollo, Emilio Isgrò, Marcello Landi, Ugo Locatelli, Arrigo Lora Totino, Stelio Maria Martini, Eugenio Miccini, Magdalo Mussio, Sarenco, Franco Vaccari, and Ben Vautier. From February to June 1969, Carrega and Mario Diacono published the magazine aaa. The magazine continued the work of Tool, publishing documents of visual, concrete and total poetry including contributions by Vincenzo Accame, Luciano Caruso, Carlfriedrich Claus, Hans Clavin, Davanzo & Gunzberg, Antonio Dias, Jean Françoise Dillon, Jan Hamilton Finlay, Stelio Maria Martini, Rolando Mignani, Jean Claude Moineau, Ito Motoyuki, Hidetoshi Nagasawa, Joel Rabinowitz, Giose Rimanelli, Shohachiro Takahashi, and lastly Emilio Villa, who since the 1960s became a sort of "godfather" for Carrega.

In January 1971, Carrega founded a new exhibition space: the Centro Tool (Tool Center), located in via Borgonuovo 20 in Milan, that continued the research of Centro Suolo e di pubblicare con lo stesso nome le ricerche del centro stesso. The center continued its activities until January 1972, organizing 21 exhibitions of visual poetry. In February of the same year Carrega founded the magazine Bollettino da dentro (Bulletin from Inside), in which he collected reports about his works. In October, with help from Vincenzo Ferrari, he re-opened the Centro Tool, organizing enquiries and exhibitions. In June 1973 the center closed its activities with an exhibition-enquiry in three stages: Card from the Word, Bodies, and Moments. In the same year he created with Ferrari and Claudio Salocchi the Centro di ricerca non finalizzata (Non-finalized Research Center).

In April 1974, the artist opened a new gallery called “Mercato del Sale” (Salt Market), honoring Marcel Duchamp (who had been called Marchand du Sel by Robert Desnos in 1921), whose activity was dedicated to the concept of a New Writing (Nuova Scrittura). The gallery, first located in via Borgonuovo 20, was transferred to a new venue in via degli Orti 16 in 1980. Sono importantissime in particolare le mostre Raccolta italiana di Nuova Scrittura (1977) e SCRITTURA ATTIVA. Processi artistici di scrittura in dodici dimostrazioni ESpositive (1979–1980). In 1982 Carrega supported the "Artescrittura" writing a short manifesto signed by Vincenzo Ferrari, Luca Patella, and Magdalo Mussio. In 1986 he collaborated with Sarenco, Eugenio Miccini, Lamberto Pignotti, and Stelio Maria Martini to re-found visual poetry. In 1993 he founded the new center Euforia Costante (Constant Euphory), a name that homaged Marcel Duchamp. This new experience ended in 1994, after having hosted a few exhibitions including one about the work of Nanni Balestrini.

Archive of new writing  
In 1988 Paolo Della Grazia, collector of works of the verbo-visual movements since the 1960s, founded the Archivio di Nuova Scrittura (Archive of New Writing, ANS) with the help of Carrega. The ANS continues the experience of the Mercato del Sale, being hosted in the same venue in via Orti 16. The ANS documentation center and library were subsequently expanded and currently constitute an exceptional body of knowledge about the national and international verbo-visual movements. The documentary heritage of the ANS is now part of the Archivio del '900 at the Museum of Modern and Contemporary Art of Trento and Rovereto. Most of the artworks are preserved at the Museion in Bolzano.

Publications
The list of publications is compiled from catalogue "Poesia visiva: 5 maestri" and book "Libri d'artista in Italia: 1960–1998", excluding one-off artist's books.

èini, mimeographed edition, Genoa, 1958
Relativiste sketches, Genoa, 1960
Rapporto tra il poeta e il suo lavoro, Genoa, Edizioni AE, 1965
Love never keeps still, Milan, 1967
Wordrips, Milan, 1967
Mikrokosmos, Milan, 1968
M(a)terie (m(a)terials), Milan, Schwarz, 1969Per il Karnhoval in Villa, Milan, 1969Poemi per azione, Rome, Lerici Editore, 1969Processo biologico, Milan, 1969Sequenza verbale su di una cosa, Milan, 1969Manifesto vetro, Stuttgart, Galerie Senatore, 1970Quasi per caso (Tavole di scrittura materica), Stuttgart, Galerie Senatore, 1970Teoria del segno grafico come cosa, Brescia, Amodulo, 1970The ness is the nest ce pas?, Milan, Schwarz, 1970Progetto numero dodici, Genoa, Galleria Pourquoi pas?, 1971Le 7 porte, Milan, 1972Una proposizione affermativa, Milan, Galleria Blu, 1972Intorno all'idea di soglia, Genoa, Masnata, 1973La frase meccanica, Milan, 1973Segni in uso, Seregno, 1973Attorno O Emme (e per analogia etc.), Milan, Mercato del Sale, 1974La Nuova Scrittura, Milan, Il Mercante d'Arte, 1974C'è il tempo, Milan, Mercato del Sale, 1975Marcel Duchamp: un nuovo mondo, Milan, Mercato del Sale, 1976La porta ap(o)erta, Macerata, La Nuova Foglio, 1976La materia del significato, Macerata, La Nuova Foglio, 1976Scrittura attiva, Bologna, Zanichelli, 1980Confortato dalla mente, Rome, Le Parole Gelate Editore, 1982Il corpo ricongiunto della scrittura, Milan, in Estra n°8, 1983Commentario, Naples, Morra Editore, 1985Many shadows of green, Naples, Morra Editore, 1986L’imperio dei sensi, Milan, Mercato del Sale Edizioni Rare, 1987Il libro errante, Milan, Mercato del Sale Edizioni Rare, 1988Il grande bianco, Naples, Morra Editore, 1988MeditAzioni, Milan, Mercato del Sale, 1989Change readings, Milan, Ixidem, 1994Liriche logiche, Verona, Parise Editore, 1995

Main works

 Appunti sul vivere, 1958
 Circumvolizione, 1959
 Encefalitica, 1960
 Èvoe, 1960
 Relativiste sketches, 1960
 Descrizione, 1962
 Il culto della gioia e del ritmo, 1962
 Appunti verbografici, 1962
 Flamin, 1962
 Vortex, 1962
 Il punto mobile, 1963
 Babebismi, 1963
 L'angolo del rosso, 1963
 Little wood, 1964
 Esotica, 1965
 Manità, 1965
 Dynamon, 1967
 Love never keeps still, 1967
 Proposizione 138-137, 1967
 Genesis, 1967
 Tautologia, 1967
 Cosmo, 1967
 Quotidiano, 1968
 Mikrokosmos, 1968
 Giardino giapponese, 1968
 Piccola Liguria, 1968
 Life, sweat life, 1968
 Manità, 1968
 La manità trasparente, 1968
 Ergo magma, 1968
 A forma di macchia, 1968
 Coitarium bicuspide, 1968

 Testo mobile, 1969
 M(a)terie, 1969
 Haiku matematico della mente nel lago, 1969
 Is a ness the nest ce pas, 1969
 Sasso, oh sasso, 1969
 Sequenza verbale su di una cosa, 1969
 Analisi della parola forma, 1969
 Alfabeto reale, 1970
 Il pozzo di vetro, 1970
 Clouds & love, 1970
 Handprint, 1970
 Orpo, 1970
 Libro di lettura, 1970
 Verbosculture, 1971
 Col martello crollano gli scudi, 1971
 Metafora arancio, 1971
 Scherzo erotico, 1972
 La ferita, 1972
 Alcune cose sparse per terra, 1973
 La porta aperta, 1973
 Qual-cosa sulla carta, 1973
 Metafora, 1973
 Allo stato delle cose, 1974
 Abbiamo incominciato, 1974
 Semplice presenza, 1974
 La pagina come scrittura, 1974
 Mitografia, primo gesto, 1974
 Teoria della pagina elementare, 1974
 Assioma di estensione, 1974
 No words, 1974
 Van Gogh, 1975
 L'A, 1975

 Nuova vita, 1975
 Caos, 1975
 Idee perdute, 1976
 Macchiando, 1976
 Il cerchio è fatto a mano e dunque imperfetto, 1977
 Sabbia, 1979
 Caffè amaro, 1979
 Non c'è niente da dire, 1984
 Mai, 1987
 Intemporion, 1988
 Per la metamorfosi di K, 1989
 Essendo Dio, 1989
 Le torte, 1990
 Esiziale, 1991
 E lì comincia il rosso, 1992
 È come se non fosse, 1994
 Così caro, così amato, così lontano, 1996
 La violenza interferisce col pensiero, 1996
 Un pezzo di muro celeste, 1997
 La forma generale delle cose, 1998
 Il bianco, il tempo, la mente, 1999
 Attorno alla morte, 1999
 Lo stato della forma, 1999
 L'abisso, 1999
 Grammaticaverbovisivaelementare, 2002
 No more chance, 2002
 It, 2002
 Tutto ciò che c'è è, 2002
 Decadenza e fine, 2003
 Serve a..., 2004
 Cosmo secondo Carrega, 2005
 Dire l'indispensabile, 2005

Personal exhibitionsThe list of exhibitions is compiled from catalogue "Poesia visiva: 5 maestri".''

1967: Galleria Le Voilà, Verona
1968: Sezione Terralba del PCI, Genoa
1969: Galerie im Uptownjazzsaloon, Innsbruck
1970: Galleria La Comune, Brescia
1970: Galleria Schwarz, Milan
1970: Galerie Senatore, Stuttgart
1971: Galerie Reckermann, Cologne
1971: Galleria Pourqoi pas?, Genoa
1971: Galleria d'Arte Contemporanea, Gaeta
1972: Galleria Blu, Milan
1973: Galleria Oggetto, Caserta
1973: Galleria La Bertesca, Genoa
1973: Galleria San Rocco, Seregno
1973: Galleria Veste Sagrada, Rio de Janeiro
1973: Galleria Pilota, Milan
1974: Mercato del Sale, Milan
1974: Visual Art Center, Naples
1975: Galleria Il Canale, Venice

1975: Galleria d'Arte Moderna, Gaeta
1975: Galleria Spazio Arte, Rome
1976: Mercato del Sale, Milan
1978: Mercato del Sale, Milan
1978: Galerie B14, Stuttgart
1978: Collegio Cairoli, Pavia
1978: Studio D'Ars, Milan
1978: Studio Marconi, Milan
1979: Studio Santandrea, Milan
1980: Galleria Multimedia, Brescia
1980: Mercato del Sale, Milan
1981: Galleria Taide, Salerno
1982: Mercato del Sale, Milan
1984: Studio Bassanese, Trieste
1984: Mercato del Sale, Milan
1985: Studio Morra, Naples
1985: Mercato del Sale, Milan
1986: Mercato del Sale, Milan

1987: Galleria Unimedia, Genoa
1988: Mercato del Sale, Milan
1989: Studio Morra, Naples
1992: Galleria Unimedia, Genoa
1993: Venice Biennale
1993: Studio XXV, Milan
1994: Galleria Silvano Lodi Jr., Milan
1994: Galleria dell'Italcornici, Milan
1994: Galleria Libreria Derbylius, Milan
1995: Archivio di Nuova Scrittura, Milan
1995: Studio Caterina Guaco, Genoa
1996: Sarenco's Club, Verona
1996: Galleria Vinciana, Milan
1997: Galleria Derbylius, Milan
1999: Galleria dell'Italcornici, Milan
1999: Studio Caterina Gualco, Genoa
2014: Galleria Derbylius, Milan

References

Essential bibliography

External links
Fondo Fraccaro-Carrega at Mart's Archivio del '900
Relativamente, 1971 performance by Carrega digitized by the Archivio del '900
"Carrega Imprimavit", 2015 Docu-film about Ugo Carrega
Ugo Carrega Artwork. General Collection, Beinecke Rare Book and Manuscript Library, Yale University.

1935 births
2014 deaths
Italian contemporary artists
Italian magazine editors
Italian publishers (people)
Italian male poets
Artists from Genoa
20th-century Italian poets
20th-century Italian male writers
Italian male non-fiction writers
Writers from Genoa